"Complicated" is a song co-written and recorded by Canadian country music singer Carolyn Dawn Johnson.  It was released in April 2001 the second single from her debut album Room with a View.  The song was also her second entry on two U.S. singles charts, peaking at number 5 on Billboard Hot Country Singles & Tracks (now Hot Country Songs) and number 59 on the Billboard Hot 100.  It also reached number 15 on that magazine's Hot Adult Contemporary Tracks chart.  The song was written by Johnson and Shaye Smith.

Content
"Complicated" is a mid-tempo country pop ballad where the female narrator expresses her fear of admitting her strong feelings to the object of her affection - a good friend, calling her feelings "complicated."

Music video
The music video was directed by Lisa Mann and premiered in mid-2001. It shows Johnson performing the song in several different areas of a large, round room with many ledges, trying to find her lover, but being unsuccessful every time. She tries to write a song, but throws the piece of paper, which in turn causes many other pieces of paper to fall on top of her. Many scenes show many different images of Johnson trying to catch up to each other, and one scent shows one image handing a phone to another. Eventually she does locater her boyfriend, and the video ends with them having fun together on the stairs and in an elevator. Scenes of Johnson performing the song against a white background with many flickering white lights, and laying down on a sofa are also shown.

Chart performance
"Complicated" debuted at number 55 on the U.S. Billboard Hot Country Singles & Tracks for the week of April 21, 2001.

Year-end charts

References

External links
[ Room with a View] review at Allmusic
Billboard search results

2001 singles
2001 songs
Carolyn Dawn Johnson songs
Songs written by Carolyn Dawn Johnson
Song recordings produced by Paul Worley
Arista Nashville singles
Songs written by Shaye Smith
Canadian Country Music Association Single of the Year singles